The Sanage Kiln (猿投窯 Sanageyō) is a generic name for a historic kiln dating back over 1,000 years. It is located about 20 km west of Toyota in the east of Aichi prefecture.

Ash glazed pottery developed from the 9th century from high temperature fire burning. Ash glazed pottery was distributed throughout the Japanese archipelago as a domestic, high-class ceramic.

References

External links 

Culture in Aichi Prefecture
History of Aichi Prefecture
Japanese pottery kiln sites